Max Croci (11 October 1968 – 8 November 2018) was an Italian director.

Biography 
Croci began his career in 1995 by making short films. In the early 2000s, he worked for Sky Italia and directed shows such as L'arte dei titoli di testa, Il cinema di carta, and the first season of Una poltrona per due, a comedy starring Alessia Ventura. After several years of producing short documentaries and television series, Croci directed his first feature film, Poli opposti.

Filmography 
 Poli opposti (2015)
 Al posto tuo (2016)
 La verità, vi spiego, sull'amore (2017)

References 

1968 births
2018 deaths
Italian film directors
People from Busto Arsizio
Italian television directors
Italian documentary film directors